The 2016 Wildwater Canoeing World Championships was the 33rd edition of the global wildwater canoeing competition, Wildwater Canoeing World Championships, organised by the International Canoe Federation.

Results

Classic

Individual

K1 men

K1 women

C1 men

C1 women

C2 men

C2 women

Team

K1 men

K1 women

C1 men

C2 men

Sprint

Individual

K1 men

K1 women

C1 men

C1 women

C2 men

C2 women

Team

K1 men

K1 women

C1 men

C2 men

See also
 Wildwater canoeing

References

External links
 

Wildwater Canoeing World Championships